The tepui antpitta or brown-breasted antpitta (Myrmothera simplex) is a species of bird in the family Grallariidae.

It occurs in Venezuela, western Guyana and far northern Roraima.

Its natural habitat is subtropical or tropical moist montane forest.

References

tepui antpitta
Birds of the Tepuis
tepui antpitta
tepui antpitta
tepui antpitta
Taxonomy articles created by Polbot